Anwar Aziz Chaudhry (6 November 1930 – 22 November 2020) was a Pakistani politician and swimmer. He competed in three events at the 1948 Summer Olympics. He was a member of the National Assembly and federal minister. He was the Interior  Minister of Punjab. His son is the Pakistani politician Daniyal Aziz. In 1990, he served as the Federal Minister of Railways & Law. He also served as the Federal Minister of Defense.

Chaudhry died on 22 November 2020, at the age of 90.

References

1930 births
2020 deaths
Olympic swimmers of Pakistan
Pakistani male swimmers
Swimmers at the 1948 Summer Olympics
Place of birth missing
Pakistani sportsperson-politicians
Pakistani MNAs 1990–1993
Federal ministers of Pakistan
Provincial ministers of Punjab
Punjabi people